Heracleium or Herakleion, also known as Heracleia or Herakleia (Ἡράκλεια), was a town in ancient Crete, which Strabo calls the port of Cnossus, and was situated, according to the anonymous coast-describer (Stadiasmus), at a distance of 20 stadia from that city. Stephanus of Byzantium simply mentions the town as the 17th of the 23 Heracleias he enumerates. Although the ecclesiastical notices make no mention of this place as a bishop's see, yet there is found among the subscriptions to the proceedings of the Second Council of Nicaea, along with other Cretan prelates, Theodoros, bishop of Heracleopolis.

The site of Heracleium is located near modern Heraklion.

References

Populated places in ancient Crete
Former populated places in Greece
Heraklion